New York's 6th State Assembly district is one of the 150 districts in the New York State Assembly. It has been represented by Democrat Philip Ramos since 2003.

Geography
District 6 is in Suffolk County. It contains portions of the town of Islip, including Bay Shore, Brentwood, Central Islip and Islandia.

Recent election results

2022

2020

2018

2016

2014

2012

References 

6
Suffolk County, New York